Stolpe is a historic village in the western suburbs of Berlin, the capital city of Germany. It is situated in the locality of Wannsee, in the borough of Steglitz-Zehlendorf. Stolpe has a documented history going back to 1299.

At the western side of Stolpe is located the Helmholtz-Zentrum Berlin.

Personalities
 Otto Erich Hartleben (1864–1905)
 Gustav Hartmann (1859–1938)
 Ludwig Pallat (1867–1947)
 Peter Pallat (1901-1992)
 Adolf Reichwein (1898–1944)
 Rosemarie Reichwein (1904–2002)
 Heinz Schröder (1910–1997)

External links

Zones of Berlin
Steglitz-Zehlendorf